The RAF raid on La Caine (1944) was an attack in Normandy  by the Second Tactical Air Force of the Royal Air Force (RAF) on 10 June 1944.

Eighteen staff officers were killed in the attack and the commander,  Leo Geyr von Schweppenburg was wounded.

Background

(Field Marshal) Gerd von Rundstedt,  ( the commander of German forces in western Europe) established , ( Leo Geyr von Schweppenburg from 19 November 1943 to 4 July 1944) as a headquarters for the administration and training of the seven Panzer divisions based in northern France and Belgium. The organisation was also to command the Panzer divisions as a strategic reserve during the anticipated Allied invasion from Britain.

Government Code and Cypher School

The Government Code and Cypher School (GC&CS) code-breaking organisation at Bletchley Park read German radio signals encrypted by the Enigma cypher machine and was part of an elaborate system of wireless listening posts, traffic analysis and direction finding used against Germany during the war.

Prelude

2nd TAF
Early on 10 June, the Second Tactical Air Force (2nd TAF) of the Royal Air Force (RAF) was ordered immediately to attack the château with every available aircraft. At RAF Hurn in Dorset, 124 Wing, comprising 181 Squadron, 182 Squadron and  247 Squadron equipped with Hawker Typhoon fighter-bombers and at RAF Holmsley South, 245 Squadron of 121 Wing were ordered to readiness. At RAF Dunsfold, 139 Wing, comprising 98 Squadron, 180 Squadron and 320 (Netherlands) Squadron plus 226 Squadron of 137 Wing at RAF Hartford Bridge flying North American B-25 Mitchell medium bombers were alerted. A maximum effort consisted of ten Typhoons per squadron and eighteen Mitchells from each of the medium bomber squadrons. The Typhoons were loaded with eight 60-pound RP-3 rockets each and the Mitchells were to carry their maximum bomb loads of eight  bombs; four squadrons of Spitfires were to escort the bombers. The plan was to attack with the rocket-firing Typhoons at low altitude, combined with bombing by the Mitchells from medium altitude.

Preparations

Wing Commander Lynn the Wing Commander (Flying) was to lead the Mitchells with 180 Squadron flying at the head of the formation. With the weather still not ideal, the first Mitchell of each bomber squadron was to be an aircraft carrying G-H navigation equipment, as a precaution against cloud over the target. While waiting on the weather, the Typhoons of 124 Wing flew two raids on gun emplacements near Caen. Eighteen Mitchells of 180 Squadron took off in three flights of six at  followed by seventeen Mitchells of 320 (Netherlands) Squadron (Commander H. V. B. Burgerhout).

At  sixteen more bombers from 98 Squadron (Squadron Leader Eager) took off, the three squadrons circling while gaining height and getting into formation, then setting course for France at  Over Selsey Bill eighteen more Mitchells of 226 Squadron (Wing Commander A. D. Mitchell) joined the formation. The 33 Spitfire Mk Vs of Air Defence of Great Britain (ADGB the defensive part of Fighter Command since 17 November 1943) for close escort and the high and low cover of three Spitfire Mk IX squadrons from 84 Group 2nd TAF (the offensive part of Fighter Command since the split with ADGB) arrived soon after. A Mitchell from 226 Squadron turned back with mechanical failure and two from 180 Squadron returned before the bomb run over La Caine, one with a loss of oil pressure and one with an instrument fault. The spare aircraft from two of the four Typhoon squadrons had joined in, making 42 Typhoons, eight of which flew without rocket armament, as fighters. The Typhoons were to attack in two waves, thirty minutes apart, the first wave to attack the motor transport around the château synchronised with the bombing by the Mitchells and the second wave to attack anything left.

Attack

The officers hurried outside to see and watched the Typhoons through binoculars, not aware that they were the target until the last minute; Schweppenburg arrived by car just before the attack. At  the Mitchells of 139 Wing moved into Vic formation with 226 Squadron at the base of the V, the squadrons remaining in flights of six.

At  the bombers released  five-hundred pound bombs, except for one Mitchell, whose eight bombs hung up. The bombs landed with great accuracy on the château and the grounds, killing Dawans and 17 of the 18 staff officers, Schweppenburg and another officer being wounded. The second wave of rocket-armed Typhoons arrived to find the château and the  vehicles destroyed and fired their rockets at anything left standing.

Aftermath

Analysis

As the Allied crews were debriefed, they claimed a big success; most bomber crews reporting that they had hit the target; anti-aircraft fire had been sparse and no German fighters had intervened, the Germans appeared to have been surprised. In the 2009 edition of a history of the use of Ultra information, Ralph Bennett wrote that an armoured counter-attack against the Allied beachhead, planned for 10 June, was postponed for 24 hours and then cancelled. Bletchley Park decrypted German signals that  had been destroyed and would have to be withdrawn to Paris to be reconstituted. The appointment of new staff under General Heinrich Eberbach, delayed the plans for the German armoured counter-offensive by three weeks but it was overtaken by events. The destruction the  HQ contributed to the loss of the initiative by the Germans. No German suspicions were aroused about Allied code breaking, because a reconnaissance aircraft had been seen before the raid.

Casualties

The château was not badly damaged but the nearby orchard, in which the HQ vehicles were parked, was thoroughly bombed and communications equipment was destroyed.

Notes

Footnotes

References

Books

Further reading

Books
 
 
 
 

Journals
 

Websites

External links

 RAF Historical Society Journal: The Overlord Campaign

World War II aerial operations and battles of the Western European Theatre
Aerial operations and battles of World War II involving the United Kingdom
Battle for Caen
History of the Royal Air Force during World War II
History of cryptography
Airstrikes
1944 in military history
1944 in France
June 1944 events